Jupiter LXXII, originally known as , is a natural satellite of Jupiter. It was discovered by Scott Sheppard in 2011. It belongs to the Carme group.

This moon was lost after its discovery in 2011. Its recovery was announced on 17 September 2018.

References

Moons of Jupiter
Irregular satellites
Discoveries by Scott S. Sheppard
20110927
Carme group
Moons with a retrograde orbit